Cycle Active was a cycling magazine published 13 times a year by TI Media. The magazine was in circulation between September 2009 and September 2016.

History and profile
Cycle Active was first published in September 2009. It was restarted in October 2015. It was first edited by Robert Garbutt and then, by Hannah Reynolds. The magazine ended publication in September 2016. The magazine and Cycle Sport were incorporated into Cycling Weekly, which is also published by the same company.

References

External links
 

2009 establishments in the United Kingdom
Sports magazines published in the United Kingdom
Cycling magazines published in the United Kingdom
English-language magazines
Magazines established in 2009
2016 establishments in the United Kingdom
Monthly magazines published in the United Kingdom
Defunct magazines published in the United Kingdom
Magazines disestablished in 2016